Niccolò II may refer to:

 Niccolò II Alberti (c. 1250 – 1321) 
 Niccolò II Sanudo (died aft. 1374)
 Niccolò II d'Este, Marquis of Ferrara (1338–1388)
 Niccolò II Ludovisi (1699–1700)

See also

 Nicholas II (disambiguation)
 Niccolò (name)